Lisa Bratton (born May 5, 1996) is an American professional swimmer for the Canadian based Toronto Titans of the International Swimming League.

Bratton won the gold medal in the 200 m backstroke at the 2018 FINA World Swimming Championships (25 m).

Career 
In summer 2019, Bratton was announced as a member of DC Trident for the inaugural ISL season. In spring of 2020 she signed for the first Canadian ISL team in the ISL, the Toronto Titans, for their first season.

At the 2018 FINA World Swimming Championships (25 m) in Hangzhou, Bratton won the gold medal in the 200 m backstroke.

References

External links
 
 

1996 births
Living people
American female backstroke swimmers
American female medley swimmers
Texas A&M Aggies women's swimmers
Universiade medalists in swimming
21st-century American women
Universiade gold medalists for the United States
Medalists at the 2019 Summer Universiade